The Grainer evaporation process is a method of producing salt.

This method uses shallow open pans with steam-heated immersion coils to evaporate the brine into salt.  

Sometimes it is paired with a partial-vacuum, to speed evaporation.

See also
 Alberger process

Industrial processes